Beirut International Women Film Festival (BWFF) is an annual event held in Beirut. The festival screens films made by women or centering women, and tackles issues that particularly affect women, including gender equality, sexual identity and domestic violence.

History  
The festival was founded in 2016, with the theme "Women for Change", with the goal of Women's Empowerment. The symbol of the festival is the Phoenician goddess Tanith, who is a mother goddess who rules the stars and sky, symbolizing fertility and life force. The festival prime award is the "Tanith of Beirut". 

BWFF is organized by the Beirut Film Society NGO.

Awards 

National Competition: 
 Best Lebanese Feature Film 
 Best Lebanese Feature Documentary 
 Best Lebanese Short Film 
 Best Lebanese Short Documentary 
 Best Lebanese Animated Film

International Competition: 
 Best Foreign Language Feature Film 
 Best Feature Documentary 
 Best Short Film 
 Best Short Documentary 
 Best Animated Short Film 
 Best Animated Feature Film
 Best Female Director  
 Best Female Cinematographer  
 Best Actress

See also 
 List of women's film festivals

References

External links 
 
 
 
 
 

Women's film festivals
Film festivals established in 2016
Film festivals in Asia
Festivals in Lebanon